Neelam Saxena Chandra (born 27 June 1969) is an Indian poet and author. She has written novels, short stories, children's stories, and poetry in English and Hindi.

Biography
Chandra has authored four novels, a novella, five collections of short stories, 25 collections of poetry, and 10 books for children. She has received several awards including the "Rabindranath Tagore International Award" in 2014. given by Xpress Publications. She was awarded a prize in a poetry contest organized by the Consulate General of the United States, Mumbai, on the topic Poetry for Social Change. The song Mere Sajan Sun Sun, for which she was the lyricist won a 'Popular Choice Award' in the Folk Fusion category at the Radio City Freedom Awards.  She was shortlisted for the IPR Annual Award 2020.

She is an IES Officer (1992 batch), and has also served as Joint Secretary of Union Public Service Commission (UPSC). She served as Executive Director of Pune Metro and now serves as Assistant Divisional Railway Manager (ADRM) of Pune Division.

Awards and recognition 
2014: Rabindranath Tagore International Poetry Award from Xpress Publications: Kerala, India.
Lyricist of Mere Sajan Sun Sun which won a 'Popular Choice' award at the Radio City Freedom Awards.
2014: Featured in Forbes India Celebrity 100 Nominees long list 2014
 2018: Humanity International Women Achievers Awards by Aditya Birla Hospital.
 2018: Soninder Samman for contribution in Hindi Literature.

See also

 List of Indian writers
 List of Indian poets
 List of Hindi-language authors
 List of Indian women writers
 List of children's literature writers

References

External links
 Official website
 ‘My daughter gave birth to the story-teller in me’ on Millennium Post
 Neelam Saxena Chandra's Interview on DD National

1969 births
Living people
Writers from Nagpur
English-language poets from India
Indian women poets
Indian women novelists
Indian women children's writers
Indian children's writers
Novelists from Maharashtra
Indian women short story writers
20th-century Indian short story writers
20th-century Indian women writers
20th-century Indian novelists
20th-century Indian poets
Women writers from Maharashtra
Poets from Maharashtra